Archbishop of Brisbane may refer to:

Anglican Archbishop of Brisbane
Roman Catholic Archbishop of Brisbane